Rachal may refer to:

Rachal (surname), list of notable people with the surname
Rachal, Texas, unincorporated community

See also
 Rachel (disambiguation)
 Rachael (given name)